Rahlir Hollis-Jefferson (born June 26, 1991) is an American professional basketball player for Kataja BC of the Korisliiga. He played college basketball with the Temple Owls and has experience playing professionally in Luxembourg and Finland.

High school career
Hollis-Jefferson played high school basketball at Chester High School in Chester, Pennsylvania. In his junior season, he averaged 10.5 points, 7.2 rebounds, 2.8 assists, and 2.1 blocks per game and lifted the Clippers to a win over Norristown High School to claim the PIAA Class AAAA state title. In the championship game, he faced Khalif Wyatt, his future Temple college teammate. The Philadelphia Inquirer named Hollis-Jefferson second team all-Southeastern Pennsylvania as well. As a senior, he averaged 17.6 points and 10.0 rebounds, recording 25 double-doubles in just 29 games.

College career
Hollis-Jefferson played college basketball with the Temple Owls from 2009 to 2013. As a junior, he averaged 5.6 points and 5.3 rebounds per game. He improved those numbers to 9.3 points and 6.6 rebounds per game as a senior.

Professional career
After leaving Temple, Hollis-Jefferson signed his first professional contract with AB Contern of the Total League in Luxembourg. He commented on the country, "It was pretty cool. I enjoyed the time there and the people were nice."

In 2014, Hollis-Jefferson returned to his home country to play for the Delaware 87ers of the NBA Development League. However, he received limited playing time.

On October 13, 2015, Hollis-Jefferson signed with the Saint John Mill Rats of the National Basketball League of Canada (NBL). However, he would never play a game for the team.

In 2016, Hollis-Jefferson signed with the Orangeville A's for the National Basketball League of Canada (NBL). At the end of the season, Hollis-Jefferson was named the Defensive Player of the Year for the league.

In October 2017, Hollis-Jefferson was drafted by the Northern Arizona Suns of the NBA G League. He averaged 9.8 points and 4.8 rebounds per game. On August 14, 2018, he signed with Kataja BC of the Finnish league.

For the 2019–20 season, Hollis-Jefferson was signed by the Memphis Hustle. He was waived on January 14, 2020, but was re-acquired by the Hustle two days later after Matt Mooney received a call-up. Hollis-Jefferson averaged 6.1 points, 3.7 rebounds, and 2.3 assists per game. He signed with Kataja on November 24, 2021.

Personal life
Rahlir is the older brother of Portland Trail Blazers small forward Rondae Hollis-Jefferson. His uncle, Karim Alexander, was murdered on August 5, 2008, and it was never solved.

References

1991 births
Living people
American expatriate basketball people in Canada
American expatriate basketball people in Finland
American expatriate basketball people in Luxembourg
American men's basketball players
Basketball players from Pennsylvania
Chester High School alumni
Delaware 87ers players
Kataja BC players
Memphis Hustle players
Northern Arizona Suns players
Power forwards (basketball)
Sportspeople from Chester, Pennsylvania
Temple Owls men's basketball players